Locust Gap is an unincorporated community in Northumberland County, Pennsylvania, United States. It is located approximately two miles southwest of Mount Carmel.

Geography
Locust Gap is located at an elevation of 1191 feet.

Major roads
Pennsylvania Route 54
Pennsylvania Route 901

References 

Unincorporated communities in Northumberland County, Pennsylvania
Unincorporated communities in Pennsylvania